Love De-Luxe was a disco studio group assembled by British producer Alan Hawkshaw (the father of Kirsty Hawkshaw).  They had one chart entry: "Here Comes That Sound Again", which spent a week at #1 on the Hot Dance Music/Club Play chart in 1979.  Vicki Brown and Jo-Ann Stone provided the vocals, and the track was technically credited to Love De-Luxe with Hawkshaw's Discophonia.

The act’s 1979 album Again and Again was even notable for the cover itself: the original feature two women embracing each other (implying that they’re Lesbians, once the album sleeve opened). But in the United States a different cover featuring illustration of cigarette packages was used.

See also
List of number-one dance hits (United States)
List of artists who reached number one on the US Dance chart

British disco groups
British electronic music groups
British dance music groups